The men's team sprint took place on 24 February 2013.

Results

Semifinals

Semifinal 1

Semifinal 2

Final
The final was held at 12:30.

References

FIS Nordic World Ski Championships 2013